O Hayat Benim (English title: That is my life) is a Turkish television drama series, originally broadcast on FOX from 2014 to 2017. The series follows Bahar who was snatched from her mother's arms (Hasret) at birth by her grandfather and is put to live with his servants until, many years later, the old man reveals her existence to her millionaire birthfather (Mehmet). As the birthfather comes to collect his daughter, the adoptive mother (Nuran) of Bahar uses her biological daughter Efsun in her stead to gain wealth for her poor family. Halfway throughout the series, the lie is revealed, but problems deepen between the characters residing in the Mehmet estate and those whose lives revolve around them.

Cast
 Ezgi Asaroğlu - Bahar Demirci/Atahan/German
 Keremcem - Ateş German
 Ceren Moray - Efsun Demirci/Atahan
 Ozan Güler - Arda Atahan
 Ayşenaz Atakol - Nuran Atahan/German
 Sinan Albayrak - Mehmet Emir Atahan
 Ahu Sungur - Hülya Atahan/Erksan
 Cem Özer - Kenan Erksan
 Oya Başar - Sultan Erdemli
 Erdal Cindoruk - Salih Sarıkaya
 Nesime Alış - Adile
 Görkem Gönülşen - Beyza
 Bahar Şahin - Müge Atahan/Saydam
 Serkan Şenalp - Cemal Saydam
 Aybüke Pusat / Beril Kayar - Zeynep Koçak/Saydam/Erdemli
 Zerrin Sümer - Ganimet Koçak
 Ayça Damgacı - Muzaffer Koçak
 Selen Görgüzel - Cevriye Koçak
 Ecem Baltacı - Hanife Koçak
 Ayçin Inci - Zühal Karasu
 Makbule Meyzinoğlu - Figen
 Cahit Gök - Volkan Karasu
 Gökhan Mete - Pertev Karasu
 Yusuf Akgün - Orkun Baytan
 İncilay Şahin - Hamiyet Baytan
 Selen Seyven - Reyhan Kaygısız
 Ayumi Takano - Teya
 Kartal Balaban - Murat
 Hira Koyuncuoğlu - Nehir Erksan
 Kebire Tokur - Hayriye Saydam
 Ceyda Ateş - Cemre Atahan
 Muhammed Kurtuluş Ayyıldız - Toprak
 Hülya Şen - Meryem
 Süleyman Atanısev - İlyas Demirci
 Yeşim Ceren Bozoğlu - Nuran Demirci
 Didem İnselel - Fulya Atahan
 Turgay Aydın - Asım Gülsoy
 Büşra Çubukçuoğlu - Hatice
 Şan Bingöl - Alp Toprak
 Sezgi Mengi - Onur
 Nurşim Demir - Edibe Atahan
 Zeynep Eronat - Mücella Demirci
 Gülsen Tuncer - Semra
 Neslihan Acar - Süreyya
 Güzide Arslan - Seçil Çevik
 Birgül Ulusoy - Sakine Çevik
 Denizhan Caner - Sadik Erkiran
 Mehmet Vanlıoğlu - Yilmaz Erkiran
 Erol Aksoy - Yusuf Erkıran
 İclal Aydın - Hasret Erkıran
 Ercüment Fidan - Eyüp Saka
 Meriç Özkaya - Yıldıray Gencer
 Oguzhan Baran - Fethi Gürsoy
 Murat Cen - Murat
 Fuat Balyemez - Fuat
 Suat Köroğlu - Burhan
 Zafer Kalfa - Ediz Sümaz
 Abdullah Toprak - Alperen Güren
 Cem Kılıç - İsmail Demirkan
 Deniz Celiloğlu - Ömer Aziz
 Barış Büktel - Cengiz
 Murat Donbaz - Orhan
 Özgün Çoban - Toros Güney
 Larissa Gacemer - Arzu German
 Egemen Samson - Doruk German
 Ahmet Yenilmez - Tayfun German
 Korhan Okay - Osman Erkıran
 Ezel Salık - Güleser Erkıran
 İrfan Çınar Var - Berat Erkıran
 Bülent Bilgiç - Kenan
 Zafer Altun - Hasan
 Umur Yiğit Vanlı - Berk
 Murat Soydan - Nedim
 Nihal Menzil - Refika
 Ayla Algan - Ayten
 Ergül Coşkun - Esma Gülsoy
 Derya Uçar - Arzu
 İrem Hatun Bora - Esma
 Ece Irtem - Sinem
 Okan Tokmak - Emre
 Reyhan İlhan - Reyhan Kartepe
 Ayhan Yıkgeç - Ayhan Kartepe
 Halil Kumova - Iskender Kartepe
 Vedi İzzi - Necati Kurşunoğlu
 Muhammed Cangören - Affan Mutallib
 Rana Cabbar - Macit
 Caner Yılmaz - Ferdi
 Volkan Alkan - Hayrettin
 Görkem Türkeş - Vural
 Gülten Çelik - Şükriye
 Alican Bayhan - Burak
 Pınar Aydın - Tülay
 Ali Savaşçı - Behçet Arakon
 Egemen Ertürk - Age Ardişçı
 Adnan Başar - Adat Saydam
 Umut Külen - Mert
 Umut Açabuğa - Şimuz
 Vural Ceylan - Seyfi
 Engin Özgör - Engin Çiki
 Ayşegül Kaygusuz - Denize Çiki
 Ece Baykal - Durdana
 Fatma Karabiber - Gulnaz
 Sezgin Uygun - Sezgin
 Ertan Güntav - Halim
 Cumhur Korkmaz - Metin
 Müge Kırgıç - Alcina
 Şener Savaş - Arkan
 Musa Çiçek - Ahmet Sağır
 Hamdi Alkan - Hamo

References

Turkish drama television series
2014 Turkish television series debuts
2017 Turkish television series endings
Fox (Turkish TV channel) original programming
Identity theft in popular culture
Works about social class
Fraud in television
Kidnapping in television
Murder in television
Television series about revenge‎ 
Television series about families
2010s romance television series
2010s drama television series
2010s crime television series
Mass media portrayals of the upper class
Serial drama television series
Mass media portrayals of the working class
Television series about sisters
Television series about cousins
Television series about dysfunctional families
Television series about couples
Television series about organized crime